5-Aza-7-deazapurine or imidazo[1,2-a][1,3,5]triazine is a heterocyclic aromatic organic compound that consists of a s-triazine ring fused to an imidazole ring. It is an isostere and isomer of purine. However, in 5-aza-7-deazapurine, N-9 of five-membered ring does not bond with hydrogen. So 5-aza-7-deazapurine derivatives must have an exocyclic substituent with a double bond to bind a sugar residue. 5-Aza-7-deazapurine nucleosides may have an oxo, thioxo, or a imine group.

Notable derivatives of this molecule include 5-aza-7-deazaguanine, which is a nucleobase of hachimoji DNA.

See also 
 Base analog
 Indolizine
 Purine analogue

References 

Simple aromatic rings
Nitrogen heterocycles
Heterocyclic compounds with 2 rings